The 1986 Amateur World Series  was the 29th Amateur World Series (AWS), an international Men's amateur baseball tournament. The tournament was sanctioned by the International Baseball Federation (IBAF). The tournament took place, for the first time, in the Netherlands, from July 19 to August 2, and was won by Cubaits 18th AWS victory.

There were 12 participating countries.

This was the last time the IBAF titled it as the AWS; the next ten competitions were held under the name Baseball World Cup, then was replaced in 2015 by the quadrennial WBSC Premier12.

Final standings

External links
Archives 1986 

World Cup
Baseball World Cup
Baseball World Cup
1986
July 1986 sports events in Europe
August 1986 sports events in Europe